The women's 5000 metres event at the 2001 European Athletics U23 Championships was held in Amsterdam, Netherlands, at Olympisch Stadion on 14 July.

Medalists

Results

Final
14 July

Participation
According to an unofficial count, 15 athletes from 11 countries participated in the event.

 (1)
 (2)
 (1)
 (1)
 (1)
 (1)
 (2)
 (1)
 (1)
 (3)
 (1)

References

5000 metres
5000 metres at the European Athletics U23 Championships